Joe Coffey may refer to:

Joe Coffey (wrestler) (born 1988), Scottish professional wrestler
Joe Coffey (active 1911), member of the Texas House of Representatives who preceded James P. Buchanan
Joe Coffey, a character in American TV police drama series Hill Street Blues
Joseph Coffey, police investigator in the Aniello Dellacroce mafia case

See also
 Tommy Joe Coffey (born 1936), Canadian Football League wide receiver and place kicker